is a village located in Aki District, Kōchi Prefecture, Japan.

Geography 
Kitagawa is located in northeastern  Kōchi Prefecture on the island of Shikoku. It is situated on a mountainous area.

Neighbouring municipalities 
Kōchi Prefecture
 Muroto
  Tōyō
 Nahari
  Tano
 Tasuda
  Umaji
Tokushima Prefecture
  Kaiyō

Climate
Kitagawa has a Humid subtropical climate (Köppen Cfa) characterized by warm summers and cool winters with light snowfall.  The average annual temperature in Kitagawa is 14.3 °C. The average annual rainfall is 2543 mm with September as the wettest month. The temperatures are highest on average in Kitagawa, at around 24.1 °C, and lowest in January, at around 4.3 °C.

Demographics
Per Japanese census data, the population of Kitagawa has been decreased rapidly since the 1960s.

History 
As with all of Kōchi Prefecture, the area of Kitagawa was part of ancient Tosa Province. The name of Aki District appears in Nara period . During the Edo period, the area was part of the holdings of Tosa Domain ruled by the Yamauchi clan from their seat at Kōchi Castle. The village of Kitagawa was established with the creation of the modern municipalities system on October 1, 1889.

Government
Kitagawa has a mayor-council form of government with a directly elected mayor and a unicameral village council of eight members. Kitagawa, together with the other municipalities of Aki District, contributes one member to the Kōchi Prefectural Assembly. In terms of national politics, the village is part of Kōchi 1st district of the lower house of the Diet of Japan.

Economy
Kitagawa's economy is centered on forestry and citrus fruit tree cultivation (yuzu)

Education
Kitagawa has one public elementary school and one public middle school operated by the village government. The village does not have a high school.

Transportation

Railway
The village does not have any passenger railway service. The nearest train station is Nahari Station on the Tosa Kuroshio Railway.

Highways

Local attractions
Yanase Dam
Kitagawa Monet Marmottan Water Garden

Noted people from Kitagawa
Nakaoka Shintarō, Bakumatsu period samurai

References

External links

Kitagawa official website 

Villages in Kōchi Prefecture